Copperfield is a series of master-planned subdivisions in unincorporated northwest Harris County, Texas, United States. The community, developed by Friendswood Development Company, has  of land.

Cyndee Smith, a retail broker with the Shelby/Estus Retail Group, stated in a 2005 Houston Business Journal article that the intersection of Texas State Highway 6 and Farm to Market Road 529 "is like ground zero" in terms of retail activity for Copperfield.

Horsepen Bayou and its tributaries are within the community.

History
Friendswood Development Company bought  at the corner of Texas State Highway 6 and Farm to Market Road 529 from the Gus Wortham estate in 1977. Two years later the first houses in Copperfield had been built and sold. In 1989 Friendswood Development bought an additional  and continued building houses into the 1990s. In 1991 Standard Pacific of Houston had acquired  in Copperfield from Friendswood Development and planned to build 265 houses in Copperfield Place Village, a community within Copperfield.

In July 2009 some residents asked for additional police presence after multiple burglaries occurred. The Harris County Sheriff's Office stated that the number of residential burglaries for the first half of 2009 in the area was less than the equivalent number in 2008.

Government and infrastructure 
Copperfield has deed restrictions intending to preserve what Katherine Feser of the Houston Chronicle refers to as a "consistent look." The subdivision prohibits billboards from appearing on commercial frontage. In 2000 the community had an annual maintenance fee of $280 per year per household.

The community has 24-hour Sheriff's Patrol through Harris County and additional paid contract through the Association.

The Cy-Fair Volunteer Fire Department serves Copperfield.

County representation
The portion of Copperfield west of Highway 6 is in County Precinct 3, headed by Steve Radack as of 2009, while the portion east of Highway 6 is in County Precinct 4, headed by Jack Cagle.

The Harris County Sheriff's Office serves Copperfield. The Northwest Command Station, headquartered at 23828 Texas State Highway 249, serves Copperfield.

Areas within Copperfield
Copperfield has seven "villages" located on both sides of State Highway 6 between FM 529 and Pebble Lake Drive.
Copperfield Place Village, developed by Standard Pacific of Texas, is located east of Highway 6.
Easton Commons Village, developed by Standard Pacific of Texas, is located east of Highway 6.
Middlegate Village is to the north, located west of and along Highway 6.
Northmead Village is west of and along Highway 6, between Middlegate Village and Southdown Village. Northmead had 958 houses in 2000. The most prominent builders of houses in the village were David Weekley Homes and Village Builders. In 2000 Rick Raymor, a real estate agent with Heritage Texas Properties, said that the price ranges in the subdivision were between $70,000 to $115,000. Raymor stated that the range represents the "smaller end of the spectrum, which makes it a really desirable first-time home for a buyer who wants to gain some good equity." In 2000 almost all of the houses in Northmead were built in the 1980s. During the same year, Ellen Vezendy, a former homeowner who sold her then-12-year-old house to another person and was quoted in a Houston Chronicle article in 2000, stated that "empty nester"s and families with young children moved into previously occupied houses in the subdivision.
Southcreek Village is along FM 529 to the west.
Southdown Village is to the south, west of and along Highway 6.
Westcreek Village is along FM 529 to the west.

The 'Copperbrook' sub-division lays off Highway 6 and West Road, and is a 290 single family home sub-division.  The area was initially planned to be for industrial use as part of the Westland 4 industrial area, but US Homes developed the residential sub-division in 1996.  Recently, house prices in the area have risen substantially, with prices ranging from around $150-$240,000 (2014).  Copperbrook HOA maintains the community pool complex and other communal areas of the sub-division, and meets at the nearby La Madeleine restaurant at 5:00 pm the first Tuesday of each month.  Copperbrook is patrolled by HCSO and by a private security firm.

Parks and recreation
All Copperfield residents have access to the  community center and community park on Willow River Drive, near Highway 6. Each village in Copperfield has one or more parks and a recreation and/or pool area. For instance, Northmead Village has greenbelts, two area parks, and a pool.

Education
Copperfield is within the Cypress-Fairbanks Independent School District.

Elementary schools within Copperfield serving sections of Copperfield include Copeland, Fiest, and Lowery. Elementary schools outside of Copperfield serving sections of Copperfield include Holmsley and Owens.

Some residents are zoned to Aragon Middle School, while some residents are zoned to Labay Middle School. Some residents are zoned to Cypress Falls High School, while some residents are zoned to Langham Creek High School.

Residents are within the Lone Star College System.

Notable residents
 Riff Raff (rapper)
 John Culberson

References

External links 

 Copperfield website

Populated places in Harris County, Texas